This is an incomplete list of those who have served as Attorney-General of County Durham:
1634-1639 Sir Thomas Tempest
bef. 1822–1834?: Sir James Scarlett
1834?: Sir Frederick Pollock
1835–1846? David Francis Atcherley
1846–1861: Robert Ingham
1861–1866: William Mathewson Hindmarch
1866–1868: Stephen Temple
1868–1872: John Richard Quain
1872–1886: John Bridge Aspinall
1886–1887: Gainsford Bruce
1887–1901: John Forbes
1901–1915: Edward Tindal Atkinson
1915–1939: Herbert Francis Manisty
1939–1940 James Willoughby Jardine
1941–?: Geoffrey Hugh Benbow Streatfeild
1950–1957: George Raymond Hinchcliffe
1957–1961: Geoffrey de Paiva Veale
1961–1965: George Stanley Waller
1965–1971: Rudolph Lyons

References

Attorneys-General